Alum Creek is a stream in the U.S. state of West Virginia. It is a tributary of Coal River. The creek was named for an alum deposit along its course.

See also
List of rivers of West Virginia

References

Rivers of Kanawha County, West Virginia
Rivers of West Virginia